Janina Hartwig (born June 8, 1961 in East Berlin) is a German actress.

Biography 
Janina Hartwig was born in East Germany  and began acting as a child. She studied acting at the Ernst Busch Academy of Dramatic Arts in Berlin-Schöneweide.

In 1978, she was discovered for the made-for-TV film "Disko mit Einlage", where she had her first starring role. After German reunification Hartwig, unlike other actors from the former GDR,  was able to continue her career - especially in television. From 1998 to 2001 she acted in 52 episodes of the television series Bei aller Liebe as Dr. Sarah Borkmann. Since 2006 she has starred as Sister Hanna in the series Um Himmels Willen, for which she won the Goldene Henne for acting together with colleague Fritz Wepper, as well as a Bambi (also with Fritz Wepper).

Janina Hartwig lives in Munich. She is divorced and has two children.

References

External links 
 Janina Hartwig at www.agentur-dietrich.de
 

1961 births
Living people
Janina Hartwig
Janina Hartwig
Ernst Busch Academy of Dramatic Arts alumni